Shergarh is a town in Takht Bhai tehsil of Mardan District in Khyber Pakhtunkhwa province of Pakistan. It located 12 km from Takht Bhai, Khyber Pakhtunkhwa, Pakistan.

Overview and history
The literal meaning of Shergarh both in Urdu and Pashto language is "home of the lions". The town is now a Union Council of the Takht Bhai tehsil of Mardan District. It falls under the NA-10 seat of the National Assembly's Electoral Process.

The town is very old, in fact, some historians cited that it can be traced back to the 13th century. Its an important point in the trade routes passing between Peshawar and Swat. Under Buddhist rule, a town existed at the same location, but had a Buddhist name. There is a famous Darul Uloom, present in the town, named Islamia Arbia Shergarh which was built in 1951. The founder of this Darolum was Muhtamim Maolana Mohammad Ahmad, who took education from Dar ul uloom Deuband India. This is the second big darul uloom of KPK. The land for the Darul Uloom was donated by Malik Azeem Khan (late), a landlord & political figure, father of late Malik Ubaid Ullah Khan (Baidul Malik), who was also one of the famous political and social figure of the area. There is one category D govt Hospital and also a number of private hospitals like Marjan Medical and Surgical Center and Al-shifa care hospital are present which provides comfort and facilities to the people of the town.

Location
The town is situated on the main highway between Peshawar and Swat. It is about 15 kilometres from the Malakand mountains to the north, 12 km from Lund Khwar and  27 km from Mardan.

See also 
 Takht Bhai Tehsil
 Mardan District

References

Populated places in Mardan District